The GPS week number rollover is a phenomenon that happens every 1,024 weeks, which is about 19.6 years. The Global Positioning System (GPS) broadcasts a date, including a week number counter that is stored in only ten binary digits, whose range is therefore 0–1,023. After 1,023, an integer overflow causes the internal value to roll over, changing to zero again. Software that is not coded to anticipate the rollover to zero may stop working or could be moved back in time by 20 or 40 years. GPS is not only used for positioning, but also for accurate time. Time is used to accurately synchronize payment operations, broadcasters, and mobile operators.

1999 occurrence 

The first rollover took place midnight (UTC) August 21 to 22, 1999.

NavCen issued an advisory prior to the rollover stating that some devices would not tolerate the rollover. Because of the relatively limited use of GPS during the 1999 rollover, disruption was minor.

2019 occurrence 

The second rollover occurred on the night of April 6 to 7, 2019, when GPS Week 2,047, represented as 1,023 in the counter, advanced and rolled over to 0 within the counter. The United States Department of Homeland Security, the International Civil Aviation Organization, and others issued a warning about this event.

Effects 

Products known to have been affected by the 2019 rollover include Honeywell's flight management and navigation software that caused delays for a KLM flight and cancellations for numerous flights in China because the technicians failed to patch the software.
Furthermore, the New York City Wireless Network (NYCWiN), a private network for New York City's municipal services, crashed.
Other products that were affected by the rollover include cellphones that were sold in 2013 or earlier, certain types of older Vaisala radiosonde groundstations, suspending launches at some stations for up to two weeks, NOAA's weather buoys,
many scientific instruments,
and consumer GPS navigation devices.

Prior to return to normal standard time from daylight saving time during the morning of November 3, 2019, Apple issued a warning to owners of iPhone and iPad devices sold before 2012 to update or risk losing Internet connectivity.

Some Furuno GPS models had an internal rollover on January 2, 2022. If the equipment was not updated with the latest software version, the equipment's date would no longer be displayed correctly.

Honda and Acura cars manufactured between 2004 and 2012 containing GPS navigation systems incorrectly displayed the year 2022 as 2002, with a time offset by several minutes. This problem was due to an overflow on the GPS epoch. The issue resolved itself in August 2022.

2038 occurrence 
The third rollover will occur between November 20 and 21, 2038.

2137 occurrence 
The above rollovers are due to a ten-bit week number; the more recent CNAV protocol, successor to the original NAV protocol, uses thirteen-bit week numbers, which amounts to a 157-year cycle; therefore, using the same epoch of 1980, the first rollover will not be until 2137.

See also 
 Time formatting and storage bugs
 Structure of the time-encoding components of GPS signals, NAV and CNAV versions

References 

August 1999 events
April 2019 events
2039 in science
2100s
Global Positioning System
Software bugs
Timekeeping
Time formatting and storage bugs